Darius Holbert (born August 5, 1974 in Dallas, Texas) is a composer of film scores for movies, television and other media, as well as a songwriter, a touring and recording musician. He has composed music for numerous films including the feature documentary "Trophy Kids" (Peter Berg/HBO),  Hobo with a Shotgun and Old 37 and contributed original music to Cedar Rapids, Shrink, and World's Greatest Dad, as well as such TV series as American Horror Story, Grey's Anatomy, American Idol and Crash, among others, and an array of commercials, games and short films. "It seems like Holbert can do just about anything in the music world," wrote Movie Maker correspondent Katie Garton.

Holbert graduated from the Arts Magnet, Booker T. Washington High School for the Performing and Visual Arts in Dallas. Selected for the touring choir of the Texas Boy Choir in 1987, he joined their tour of Australia as a featured soloist and ultimately composed for and conducted an ensemble within the choir. He studied composition and arranging at London's Royal Academy of Music and the University of North Texas. He has performed and released several albums as a singer-songwriter under the stage name dariustx, and has worked with Dave Brubeck, the Dallas Symphony Orchestra, Britney Spears, Diane Warren, Bobby Brown, Sophie B. Hawkins, Everlast (for whom he co-produced and played pedal-steel and six-string guitars, banjo, organ, keyboards and other instruments on the album Songs of the Ungrateful Living) and Wu-Tang Clan, among many other artists, songwriters and musical organizations. He served as music director for hip-hop group House of Pain's 20th anniversary reunion tour. He has been commissioned to write operas, chamber works, and modern dance pieces. His work "When at Last I Leapt into the Jaws" earned him finalist status in a collaboration between Composer's Voice and Movement Research.  Darius has studios in Los Angeles and New York City and is a member of ASCAP, SCL, NARAS.

Awards
For the 2018 feature documentary "The Crest" (Mark Covino)

 United International Film Festival - Best Original Music
 Los Angeles Film Awards - Best Score
 The Mod Con - London Film Festival - Official Selection
 Los Angeles CineFest - Semi-Finalist
 London Independent Film Awards - Official Selection
 Barcelona Planet Film Festival - Best Soundtrack
 Film Score Festival - Official Selection

For the 2013 feature documentary "Trophy Kids" (Peter Berg/ HBO):

 International Independent Film Festival: Gold Award, Best Original Film Score 
For the 2012 short film Oh, The Places You'll Go!:
 Moondance International Film Festival (New York, NY): Grand Prize, Best Original Film Score
 Park City Film Music Festival: Official Original Score Selection
 Neon Reverb Music In Film Festival: Music In Film, Official Selection
 Action On Film Festival: Official Selection, Film Scores
Other Honors
 Composer's Voice/Movement Research's 2012 "Open" Series (New York, NY): Finalist

References

External links
 
 

1974 births
Living people
American keyboardists
American male singer-songwriters
Musicians from Dallas
Singer-songwriters from Texas
21st-century American singers
21st-century American male singers